Dolichospermum flosaquae is a species of cyanobacteria belonging to the family Aphanizomenonaceae.

Type locality: Sweden, Denmark, Scotland, France, Germany, USA.

Synonyms
 Anabaena flosaquae Brébisson ex Bornet & Flauhault 1886
 Anabaena flos-aquae

References

Nostocales